Amanita olivaceogrisea is a species of Amanita found in England, Estonia, France, Latvia, and Sweden.

External links

olivaceogrisea
Fungi of Europe
Fungi described in 1986